The 42 Form (Competition Form, Mixed Form) t'ai chi ch'uan is the standard Wushu competition form which combines movements drawn from the Chen, Yang, Wu, and Sun styles of traditional T'ai chi ch'uan (Taijiquan). It was created in 1989 by Professors Men Hui Feng from The Beijing Sport Institute and Li De Yin from the People's University for the Chinese Sports Committee. The 42-form has been subjected to criticism for being a hybrid form, but in actual practice it has received a lot of positive attention as well, for being a challenging, fluid form which loads the body with energy (qi). Today it is a popular form for competition as well as for personal health benefits.
                      
At the 11th Asian Games of 1990, Wushu was included as an item for competition for the first time with the 42 Form being chosen to represent T'ai chi. The forms are:

 Commencing form (起势)
 Grasp the peacock's tail (right) (右揽雀尾)
 Single whip (left) (左单鞭)
 Raise hands (提手)
 White crane spreads its wings (白鹤亮翅)
 Brush knee and twist step on both sides (搂膝拗步)
 Parry and punch (撇身捶)
 Deflect and press on both sides (捋挤势)
 Parry and push (进步搬拦捶)
 Apparent close (如封似闭)
 Open and close hands (开合手)
 Single whip (right) (右单鞭)
 Punch under elbow (肘底捶)
 Turn body and push palm on both sides (转身推掌)
 Fair lady works the shuttles on both sides (玉女穿梭)
 Kick with heel on both sides (右左蹬脚)
 Cover hands and punch (掩手肱捶)
 Part the wild horse's mane on both sides (野马分鬃)
 Wave hands like clouds (云手)
 Step back and beat the tiger (獨立打虎)
 Separate legs (right) (右分脚)
 Strike opponent's ears with both fists (雙峰贯耳)
 Separate legs (left) (左分脚)
 Turn body and slap foot (转身拍脚)
 Step forward and punch downward (进步栽捶)
 Oblique flying (斜飛势)
 Snake creeps to the right (单鞭下势)
 Golden rooster stands on one leg (right and left) (金鸡獨立)
 Step back and thrust palm (退步穿掌)
 Press palm in empty stance (退步压掌)
 Hold palm up and stand on one leg (獨立托掌)
 Lean with body in horse stance (马步靠)
 Turn body for large roll back (转身大捋)
 Grab and punch in resting step (歇步擒打)
 Thread palm and push down (穿掌下势)
 Step forward to seven-star posture (上步七星)
 Mount the tiger and stand on one leg (腿步跨虎)
 Turn body with lotus kick (转身摆莲)
 Bend the bow to shoot the tiger (彎弓射弧)
 Grasp the peacock's tail (left) (左揽雀尾)
 Cross hands (十字手)
 Closing form (收势)

See also
24-form tai chi chuan
Taijijian

References

External links
Article on the Combined 42 Tai Chi Forms - includes the names of each of the 42 steps, and explanations of its inner meaning by Dr. Paul Lam.
Book cover with short bio: Li De Yin.
History of Tai Chi 42 competition Form - This Combined set routine incorporates movements drawn from the Sun, Wu, Chen, and Yang styles of traditional Tai Chi Chuan (Taijiquan) the “Supreme Ultimate Fist”
42 Form Tai Chi (Back View) (2013.09.01)  displays names of each form as movements are demonstrated.

Tai chi styles
Neijia